Alen Hodzovic (born May 30, 1977) is a German actor and singer. In 2009, he became the first German citizen to win First Prize at  Kurt Weill Foundation's international Lotte Lenya Competition for singers. He graduated from the Royal Academy of Music in London where he won the H.L. Hammond Prize for Verse Speaking, adjudicated by director John Caird. He played Raoul in the Stuttgart production of  Andrew Lloyd Webber's The Phantom of the Opera and Ken in a German-language production of John Logan's play Red. In 2007, he appeared as a background singer for Elton John at the Concert for Diana at Wembley Stadium.

References

 The Kurt Weill Foundation for Music New York
 
 Alen Hodzovic on German Wikipedia

Living people
Year of birth missing (living people)
German male stage actors
German male singers